"Golden Age" is an original radio play written by James Goss and is a spin-off from the British science-fiction television series Torchwood, itself a spin-off from Doctor Who. This episode aired on 2 July 2009 on BBC Radio 4. It stars John Barrowman as Captain Jack Harkness, Eve Myles as Gwen Cooper, Gareth David-Lloyd as Ianto Jones and Jasmine Hyde as The Duchess.

Plot

The story begins with the team in Delhi, India, with Ianto watching packages being delivered to find anything suspicious. He finds out that the packages are addressed to Captain Jack Harkness. An energy field is being spread across Delhi, and while Gwen and Ianto try to remove the crowds from the city, the energy spike hits and everybody disappears except the Torchwood team. Jack seems to think that the people were marked before the spike hit, and suddenly Jack remembers a building that he had shut down 80 years ago that shouldn't exist. The building is Torchwood India.

There, Jack, Gwen and Ianto meet a secretary, Mr. Daz, who remembers Jack and find that the members of the Royal Connaught Club are still alive and have not aged a day. The Duchess, Eleanor, Duchess of Melrose, arrives with a shotgun and starts to shoot Jack, although Jack manages to convince her to stop shooting by explaining the situation. Torchwood India was founded by Queen Victoria to gather all alien artefacts in India, but on 28 February 1924 Captain Jack Harkness had everything shipped to Britain from Delhi.

The team split up to search the club, and while George Gissing takes Gwen and Ianto through the basement, he mentions that he knows that there used to be heaps of artefacts in Torchwood India.  When Gwen claims that thousands of people just vanished before her eyes, Gissing does not believe her. Jack continues to talk to The Duchess, and she claims that the radiation from the residual energy of the alien artefacts has kept the three of them young and alive.

The Duchess, having had a fling in the past with Captain Jack, continues to toy with Jack and wishes to know why Torchwood India was shut. Jack replies that the Empire was coming to an end and would have to have been shut down in India, but if he could do it again he would have chosen differently and kept the branch open. Mr Gissing and Mr Daz take Gwen and Ianto hostage when they become too close to the artefacts, while The Duchess explains that she still had one artefact left – a time store which has kept 24 February 1924 every day until present day as they refused to embrace the changes happening in India and the closing of Torchwood. The power needed to sustain an entire club for 80 years is enormous, but the Duchess claims that it is now powered by people of India to keep the time store going, as India has a surplus of commoners according to Gissing.

The Duchess has plans to consume the entire earth to take them back to 24 February 1924 by buying wireless under Jack's name and using it to boost the energy field to change the world again, firstly by starting with Winston Churchill to stop the idea of independence. Eleanor has become insane during the time that she has spent in the club and sends Jack into the room which will feed them into the time store, but due to the fact that he cannot die the time store is feeding off him continuously and he tries desperately to save Gwen and Ianto from the same fate as the many innocent people of India. Jack manages to turn off the time store and the mast and has to get as many people out of the club before the club explodes from the time store. The time store ruptures, and everybody inside since 1924 refused to leave the club and are now frozen in time, marking the end of Torchwood India.

Continuity
 The Duchess uses a variant on a phrase commonly said by Jack Harkness, saying the 20th (rather than the 21st) century was when everything changed.
 The Duchess mentions Queen Victoria opening Torchwood.
 The Duchess refers to Torchwood India collecting "the yeti spheres of the Himalaya", a reference to the Doctor Who story "The Abominable Snowmen", in which the Great Intelligence's robot yeti are powered by a spherical device in their chests.

References

External links
Torchwood Website
Torchwood Radio Play
Torchwood Radio Play - Golden Age

Radio plays based on Torchwood
2009 radio dramas
2009 audio plays
Works by James Goss